Park Je-yun (born December 30, 1994 in Gangwon, South Korea) is an alpine skier from South Korea. He competed for South Korea at the 2014 Winter Olympics in the alpine skiing events.

References

External links

1994 births
Living people
Olympic alpine skiers of South Korea
Alpine skiers at the 2014 Winter Olympics
South Korean male alpine skiers
Alpine skiers at the 2017 Asian Winter Games
Sportspeople from Gangwon Province, South Korea
21st-century South Korean people